Lusina may refer to the following places in Poland:
Lusina, Lower Silesian Voivodeship (south-west Poland)
Lusina, Lesser Poland Voivodeship (south Poland)
Lusina, part of the Swoszowice district of Kraków